Cork County Council is the authority responsible for local government in County Cork, Ireland. As a county council, it is governed by the Local Government Act 2001. The council is responsible for housing and community, roads and transportation, urban planning and development, amenity and culture, and environment. The council has 55 elected members. Elections are held every five years and are by single transferable vote. The head of the council has the title of Mayor. The county administration is headed by a Chief Executive, Tim Lucey. The county seat is Cork.

History
Originally meetings of Cork County Council were held in the back portion of the top floor of Cork Courthouse. By the 1950s these premises were becoming inadequate and County Hall opened in April 1968.

Boundary change
The area of Cork County Council was reduced on 31 May 2019, ceding territory to Cork City Council. This implemented changes under the Local Government Act 2019.

The 2015 Cork Local Government Review recommended merging Cork City Council and Cork County Council into a single "super council"; however, a minority report opposed the merger, with a subsequent report published by an expert advisory group in 2017 recommending a city boundary extension.

Local Electoral Areas and Municipal Districts
Cork County Council is divided into the following municipal districts and local electoral areas, defined by electoral divisions.

Councillors
The following were elected at the 2019 Cork County Council election.

2019 seats summary

Councillors by electoral area
This list reflects the order in which councillors were elected on 24 May 2019.

Notes

Co-options

Changes in affiliation

References

External links

Map of LEAs

Politics of County Cork
County councils in the Republic of Ireland